Hills and Central Assam division is an administrative division of Assam under the jurisdiction of a Commissioner, who is officially stationed at Nagaon. It consists of the following districts: Dima Hasao, Karbi Anglong, West Karbi Anglong, Hojai, Nagaon and Marigaon.

References

Divisions of Assam